Hans Holzer (26 January 1920 – 26 April 2009) was an Austrian-American author and parapsychologist. He wrote more than 120 books on supernatural and occult subjects for the popular market as well as several plays, musicals, films, and documentaries, and hosted a television show, Ghost Hunter (not to be confused with Ghost Hunters).

Life and career
Holzer was born in Vienna, Austria, the son of Martha (Stransky) and Leo Holzer, a businessman. His interest in the supernatural was sparked at a young age by stories told to him by his uncle Henry. He went on to study archaeology and ancient history at the University of Vienna but as the family was Jewish, they decided it was unsafe to stay in Austria and left the country for New York City in 1938. He studied Japanese at Columbia University and, after studying comparative religion and parapsychology, claimed to have obtained a Ph.D. at a school called the London College of Applied Science which has never been validated. He went on to teach parapsychology at the New York Institute of Technology. Holzer wrote more than 120 books on ghosts and the afterlife.

His extensive involvement in researching the supernatural included investigating The Amityville Horror and some of the most prominent haunted locations around the world. He also worked with well-known trance mediums such as Ethel Johnson-Meyers, Sybil Leek, and Marisa Anderson. Holzer has been credited with creating the term "The Other Side" (already in use, however, in nineteenth-century spiritualism) or in full "The Other Side of Life".  He is sometimes credited with having coined the term ghost hunter, which was the title of his first book on the paranormal published in 1963; however, an earlier book by Harry Price, published in 1936, was titled Confessions of a Ghost Hunter.

In 1970, Holzer published a study of spirit photography called Psychic Photography: Threshold of a New Science?. The book included photographs taken by the spirit photographer John Myers.

Holzer believed in life after death and the existence of ghosts, spirits, and "stay behinds". Ghosts were, according to him, imprints left in the environment which could be "picked up" by sensitive people. Spirits were intelligent beings who could interact with the living, while "stay behinds" were those who found themselves earth-bound after death. He also believed in reincarnation and the existence of "levels of consciousness".

Holzer and his wife Countess Catherine Geneviève Buxhoeveden, a sixth-generation descendant of Russian Empress Catherine the Great, had two daughters. The marriage was eventually dissolved.

The Amityville Horror
Holzer's most famous investigation was into The Amityville Horror case. In January 1977, Holzer and spiritual medium Ethel Meyers entered 112 Ocean Avenue in Amityville, New York. Meyers claimed that the house had been built over an ancient Native American burial ground and the angry spirit of a Shinnecock Indian Chief, "Rolling Thunder", had possessed the previous occupant, Ronald Defeo Jr., driving him to murder his family. Photographs taken at the scene revealed curious anomalies such as the halos which appeared in the supposed images of bullet marks made in the original 1974 murders. Holzer's claim that the house was built on Indian sacred land was, however, denied by the local Amityville Historical Society and it was pointed out that it was the Montaukett Indians, and not the Shinnecocks, who had been the original settlers in the area. Holzer went on to write several books about the subject, both fiction and non-fiction.

Vegetarianism
Holzer was a vegetarian and teetotaler. In 1973, he authored The Vegetarian Way of Life. In the book he stated that "I myself am a Lactarian: I eat cheeses and milk products but I do not eat eggs or egg products. Those who are Lactarians like myself find that their diet is well-balanced and generally there is enough of a variety of foods available to them so that no problem of nutrition exists."

Reception
Holzer's endorsement of psychics in ghost hunting was criticized in an article for the Journal for the Society for Psychical Research which "cast considerable doubt on the objectivity and reliability of his work as a whole." Holzer was a proponent of psychic archaeology, which has been widely criticized as pseudoscience.

His book Patterns of Destiny from 1975 appeared as a noticeable prop in the movie Flatliners, standing next to the framed photograph of Julia Roberts character's dead father.

Skeptical investigator Joe Nickell has written that Holzer did not provide verification for some of his claims and he credulously accepted spirit photographs, anecdotal reports, and other doubtful evidence.

Nickell also wrote that the mediums Holzer endorsed, Ethel Meyers and Sybil Leek, offered "unsubstantiated, even unverifiable claims, or information that can be gleaned from research sources or from knowledgeable persons by “cold reading” (an artful method of fishing for information)."

Fellow ghost hunter Peter Underwood wrote an obituary for Holzer in The Guardian, in which he disputed Holzer's claim (made in his 1979 book Murder in Amityville) that the house on Ocean Avenue in Amityville was built on the site of a Shinnecock burial ground.

Holzer's daughter, Alexandra Holzer, wrote a 2008 book titled Growing Up Haunted, based on her life with her father and his paranormal quest. The book was optioned by Vance Entertainment to be developed as a potential feature film.

Travel Channel began a TV series in 2019, The Holzer Files, that returns current ghost hunters to some of Hans Holzer's documented cases.

Bibliography

 

 (co-written with Philip Solomon)

 (co-written with Antonio Silva)

References

External links
Interview with Holzer (ghostvillage.com).
Hans Holzer - Daily Telegraph obituary, 1 May 2009.
Obituary in The Guardian by Peter Underwood, 18 June 2009.
Obituary in The Economist, 7 May 2009.
Obituary in The New York Times by William Grimes (journalist), 29 April 2009.
Bibliography (fantasticfiction.co.uk).
Findagrave Memorial

1920 births
2009 deaths
American occult writers
American spiritualists
American vegetarianism activists
Austrian emigrants to the United States
Austrian male writers
Paranormal investigators
Parapsychologists
The Amityville Horror